La route d'Armilia is a graphic novel by Belgian comic artists François Schuiten and Benoît Peeters, the fourth volume of their ongoing Les Cités Obscures series. It was first published in an early, notably different version in Danish as Vejen Til Armilia in 1987, in its final form in the Franco-Belgian comics magazine À Suivre (#123), and as a standalone French album first in 1988 by Casterman. Although subsequently also published in at least Dutch and German, La route d'Armilia remains unpublished in English as of 2008; however, an English translation authorized by Casterman is available on the internet as a .txt file (see External links below). An unofficial digital edition (available online) has been produced by lettering French scans with this English manuscript.

Editions

In French 

La route d'Armilia, 1988, Casterman (type font on cover and inside)
La route d'Armilia, 1988, Casterman (hand-lettered font on cover and inside)
La route d'Armilia, 1993, Casterman

External links 
 The Road to Armilia, English translation of La route d'Armilia (.txt file), translated by NBM Publishing translator Joe Johnson, authorized by Casterman (right-click on link to save)
 La route d'Armilia, a few annotated pictures from the album (French)
 La route d'Armilia, review
 Series overview on A comprehensive review of the Obscure Cities series for English-speaking fans
 Les Cités Obscures by Juliani Darius on The Continuity Pages

Steampunk comics
Belgian comics titles